Hoffler Creek is a  tidal inlet of the James River on its southern side in Hampton Roads. It forms the boundary between the cities of Portsmouth and Suffolk, Virginia. The mouth of the creek is between the Nansemond River to the west and Craney Island to the east.

Normally a tranquil salt marsh, the estuary can change dramatically with tide, wind and rain. In 2003, Hurricane Isabel caused significant flooding into yards abutting the creek. Less dramatic flooding occurs with Nor'easter storms, which often last several days.

Wildlife 
Despite loss of habitat from wooded land to single-family dwellings, Hoffler Creek continues to support wildlife including:
Otter, raccoon, gray fox, deer, opossum, groundhog, rabbit
Bald eagle, osprey, pileated woodpecker, duck, goose, heron, egret, hawk, gull, owl, pelican
Blue crab, turtle

See also
List of rivers in Virginia

References

External links
Hoffler Creek Wildlife Foundation & Preserve

Tributaries of the James River
Bodies of water of Portsmouth, Virginia
Bodies of water of Suffolk, Virginia
Estuaries of Virginia
Salt marshes
Landforms of Portsmouth, Virginia
Landforms of Suffolk, Virginia